Unloved: Huronia's Forgotten Children is a Canadian documentary film, directed by Barri Cohen and released in 2022. The film documents the history of child abuse at Ontario's Huronia Regional Centre facility for developmentally disabled children, based in part on the story of her own two older brothers, Alfred and Louis, who died at the institution.

The film premiered at the 2022 Hot Docs Canadian International Documentary Festival, where it was named the third-place winner of the Rogers Audience Award. It is also slated for broadcast on the Documentary Channel and CBC Gem later in the year.

The film was a nominee for the DGC Allan King Award for Best Documentary Film at the 2022 Directors Guild of Canada awards.

References

External links

2022 films
2022 documentary films
Canadian documentary films
Documentary films about child abuse
2020s English-language films
2020s Canadian films